The 2003–04 season was the 107th season of competitive football by Heart of Midlothian, and their 21st consecutive season in the top level of Scottish football, competing in the Scottish Premier League. Hearts also competed in the UEFA Cup, Scottish Cup, League Cup and the Festival Cup.

Fixtures

Pre-Season Friendlies

Scottish Premier League

Uefa Cup

Festival Cup

League Cup

Scottish Cup

Final league table

See also
List of Heart of Midlothian F.C. seasons

References

External links 
 Official Club website
 Complete Statistical Record

Heart of Midlothian F.C. seasons
Heart of Midlothian